Acrotelsa is a genus of silverfish in the family Lepismatidae. There are at least two described species in Acrotelsa.

Species
These two species belong to the genus Acrotelsa:
 Acrotelsa collaris (Fabricius, 1793)
 Acrotelsa galapagoensis Guthrie

References

Further reading

 
 

Lepismatidae
Articles created by Qbugbot